Events in the year 1877 in Belgium.

Incumbents
Monarch: Leopold II
Head of government: Jules Malou

Events
 Musical Instrument Museum established in the Royal Conservatory of Brussels
 Plantin-Moretus Museum established in Antwerp
 16 January – Extradition agreement with the Netherlands signed in Brussels.
 14 March – Trade agreement with Romania signed in Brussels.
 9 July – Law on secret ballot introduces use of voting booths at Belgian polling stations.
 19 August – Plantin-Moretus Museum opens to the public.

Publications

Periodicals
 Annuaire de l'Académie royale de Belgique, 43 (Brussels, F. Hayez)
 Bulletins de l'Académie royale des sciences, des lettres et des beaux-arts de Belgique, 46 (Brussels, F. Hayez).
 Moniteur belge.
 Recueil consulaire, 23 (Brussels, C. Torfs)
 Recueil des lois et arrêtés royaux de la Belgique, 48 (Brussels, Bruylant-Christophe)
 Revue de Belgique, 25-26.
 Revue de l'instruction publique en Belgique, 20 (Ghent, Eug. Vanderhaeghen)
 Revue de l'horticulture belge et étrangère, 3.

Other
 Georges Eekhoud, Myrtes & Cyprès.

Art and architecture

Buildings
 E. Van Hoecke-Peeters, Jesuit house in Oostakker

Paintings
 Léon Herbo, portrait of the sculptor Julien Dillens, winner of the 1877 Prix de Rome

Science
 Louis Melsens becomes the second person to receive the Guinard Prize by the Brussels Academy, a Belgian award, given every 5 years since 1872, to the scientist who has written the best work or created the best invention to improve the material or intellectual position of the working class.

Births
 9 January – Joseph Mansion, philologist (died 1937)
 24 January – Louise van den Plas, feminist (died 1968)
 21 February – Jean Capart, Egyptologist (died 1947)
 11 March – Alfred Loewenstein, financier (died 1928)
 3 July – Marthe de Kerchove de Denterghem, feminist (died 1956)
 10 July – Hélène Dutrieu, cyclist and aviatrix (died 1961)
 14 July – Marie Alexandrine Becker, poisoner (died 1942)
 11 August – Aloïs Catteau, cyclist (died 1939)
 10 September – Henri Denis, general (died 1957)
 26 September – Bertha De Vriese, physician (died 1958)
 6 October – Oscar Taelman, Olympic rower (died 1945)
 10 November – Marie-Georges-Gérard-Léon le Maire de Warzée d'Hermalle, diplomat (died 1931)

Deaths
 1 January – Adolf Alexander Dillens (born 1821), painter
 3 April – Jean-Baptiste Madou (born 1796), artist
 16 April – Auguste Payen (born 1801), architect
 2 June – Eugène Prévinaire (born 1805), civil servant and banker
 3 June – Camille de Briey (born 1800), diplomat
 November – Louis-Pierre Verwee (born 1807), painter
 7 November – Henri Guillaume (born 1812), general

References

 
Belgium
Years of the 19th century in Belgium
1870s in Belgium
Belgium